Riverside Insights is a publisher of clinical and educational standardized tests in the United States; it is headquartered in Itasca, Illinois. It is also a charter member of the Association of Test Publishers.

Riverside Insights was established as a wholly owned subsidiary of Houghton Mifflin Harcourt, a leading educational publisher in the United States, in 1979.

History

Early history

Riverside originated in 1852 as The Riverside Press, a book printing plant in Boston, Massachusetts. Henry Houghton originally started The Riverside Press in an old Cambridge building along the banks of the Charles River. A visitor described it as "one of the model printing-offices in America". Houghton chose to employ women as well as men as compositors, a radical decision which he said was influenced by the Victoria Press in England.

In 1880, George Mifflin entered into a partnership with Henry Houghton and together founded and led Houghton Mifflin Company. They soon established an educational department and quickly expanded the company's educational offerings.

Modern era

Beginning with the publication of the Stanford-Binet Intelligence Scale during World War I, Houghton Mifflin became increasingly involved in publishing standardized tests. The Riverside Publishing Company was officially established as a wholly owned subsidiary of Houghton Mifflin in 1979.

Markets

Clinical
The clinical side of Riverside's business focuses on providing research and test materials for practicing professionals.

Products
Batería III Woodcock-Muñoz NU
Batería IV
Battelle Developmental Inventory, 2nd Edition Normative Update (BDI-2 NU)
Battelle Developmental Inventory, 2nd Edition-Spanish (BDI-2 Spanish)
Battelle Developmental Inventory, 3rd Edition (BDI-3)
Beery-Buktenica Developmental Test of Visual-Motor Integration (Beery VMI-5)
Bender Visual-Motor Gestalt Test, Second Edition (Bender-Gestalt II)
Bilingual Verbal Ability Tests, Normative Update (BVAT NU)
Das•Naglieri Cognitive Assessment System (CAS)
Dean-Woodcock Neuropsychological Battery (DW)
ESGI (Educational Software for Guiding Instruction)
ImPACT Applications
Infant-Toddler Developmental Assessment (IDA)
Koppitz-2
Parents' Observations of Infants and Toddlers (POINT)
Scales of Independent Behavior–Revised (SIB–R)
Stanford-Binet Intelligence Scales, Fifth Edition (SB5)
Universal Nonverbal Intelligence Test (UNIT)
Woodcock-Johnson (WJ IV)
Woodcock-Johnson Test of Early Cognitive and Academic Development (ECAD)
Woodcock Interpretation & Instructional Interventions Program (WIIIP)
Woodcock-Johnson III NU Brief Battery
Woodcock-Johnson III Diagnostic Reading Battery (WJIII DRB)
Woodcock-Johnson III NU Tests of Achievement
Woodcock-Johnson III NU Tests of Cognitive Abilities
Woodcock-Muñoz Language Survey –Revised
The Sir Roger De Coverley Papers

K-12 Educational 
The educational side of Riverside's business focuses on providing research and test materials for educational professionals as well as Universities with psychology programs.

Products
Assess2Know
Basic Early Assessment of Reading (BEAR)
Cognitive Abilities Test (CogAT)
Criterion Online Writing Evaluation
DataDirector
DataManager
Diagnostic Assessments of Reading, 2nd Edition (DAR)
easyCBM
Edusoft Assessment Management System
Gates-MacGinitie Reading Tests, Fourth Edition (GMRT)
Interactive Results Manager (iRM)
Iowa Algebra Aptitude Test, Fifth Edition (IAAT)
IowaFlex
Iowa Tests of Basic Skills, Forms A, B, and C (ITBS)
Iowa Tests of Educational Development, Forms A, B, and C (ITED),
Logramos
Nelson-Denny Reading Test (ND)
Qualls Early Learning Inventory (QELI)
SkillSurfer
Trial Teaching Strategies (TTS)

References

External links 
 Riverside Insights website 

Book publishing companies based in Illinois
Companies based in DuPage County, Illinois
Publishing companies established in 1979